John Peverell Marley (August 14, 1899 – February 2, 1964) was an American cinematographer. He is one of only six cinematographers to have a star on the Hollywood Walk of Fame.

Life and career
Born in San Jose, California, Marley began his career soon after graduating high school during the silent film era. His first film was the 1923 Cecil B. DeMille biblical epic The Ten Commandments. He later became DeMille's chief cameraman and would continue to work with DeMille throughout his career. He went on to work on 1929's The Godless Girl, starring his then-fiancée Lina Basquette. The couple divorced after just one year and Marley went on to marry dancer Virginia McAdoo and, later, actress Linda Darnell.

In the 1930s, Marley received an Academy Award nomination for Best Cinematography on the 1938 historical drama Suez. In 1948, he was nominated again for his work on the film Life with Father, starring Elizabeth Taylor and William Powell. After his divorce from Darnell in 1952, Marley continued to work on films including 1952's The Greatest Show on Earth for which he won a Golden Globe Award for Best Cinematography – Color. The following year, he filmed House of Wax, followed by King Richard and the Crusaders in 1954, Serenade in 1956, and The Spirit of St. Louis in 1957. In the late 1950s, he branched out to television working on the series Telephone Time and Bronco. Marley last worked on a 1961 episode of the series Bus Stop.

Marley died on February 2, 1964, in Santa Barbara. He is interred at Hollywood Forever Cemetery in Los Angeles.

Filmography

Awards and nominations

References

External links

1899 births
1964 deaths
American cinematographers
Burials at Hollywood Forever Cemetery
Golden Globe Award winners
People from San Jose, California